Comitas subcarinapex is an extinct species of sea snail, a marine gastropod mollusc in the family Pseudomelatomidae.

Description

Distribution
This extinct marine species was found in Lower Miocene strata off Southland, New Zealand. The type specimen is in the Auckland Museum.

References

 A.W.B. Powell (1942), The New Zealand Recent and Fossil Mollusca of the family Turridae with general notes on Turrid nomenclature and systematics
 A.W.B. Powell (1942), Bulletin of the Auckland Institute and Museum, 2 p. .60, pi. 10, fig. 5
 Maxwell, P.A. (2009). Cenozoic Mollusca. pp 232–254 in Gordon, D.P. (ed.) New Zealand inventory of biodiversity. Volume one. Kingdom Animalia: Radiata, Lophotrochozoa, Deuterostomia. Canterbury University Press, Christchurch.

External links
 Auckland Museum: Comitas subcarinapex (holotype)
 Tucker Abbott, Indo-Pacific mollusca" vol. 2: Comitas allani; Academy of Natural Sciences of Philadelphia: Philadelphia, Pennsylvania, 19103 U.S.A. 

subcarinapex
Gastropods described in 1942
Gastropods of New Zealand